Ricardo Arroyo García (born 28 November 1950) is a Spanish actor, best known for his performance as Vicente Maroto on the Spanish television series La que se avecina, and as Higinio Heredia in Aquí no hay quien viva.

References

External links
 

1950 births
Living people
Male actors from Barcelona
21st-century Spanish male actors
Spanish male television actors